Jakub Nakládal  (born 30 December 1987) is a Czech former professional ice hockey defenseman who last played for HC Dynamo Pardubice of the Czech Extraliga (ELH).

Playing career 
Undrafted, Nakládal played in his native Czech Republic making his Czech Extraliga debut in the 2006–07 season with HC Pardubice. During his sixth season with Pardubice, having established himself as a defensive defenseman, Nakládal transferred mid-season to the Kontinental Hockey League  with Salavat Yulaev Ufa in 2011–12.

After stints with HC Spartak Moscow and HC Lev Praha, Nakládal opted to sign in the Finnish Liiga with TPS Turku for the 2014–15 season. Contributing with 15 points in 50 games, Nakládal garnered the attention of NHL scouts with his defensively sound game.

On 19 May 2015, Jakub signed a NHL contract in agreeing to a one-year two-way contract with the Calgary Flames. He was assigned to AHL affiliate, the Stockton Heat, to begin his North American career in the 2015–16.  On 9 February 2016, after he was recalled to Calgary he played his first NHL game. On 1 March 2016, he recorded his first NHL goal in a game against the Boston Bruins.

On 9 October 2016, after going un-signed over the summer, Nakládal belatedly signed a one-year deal to add a veteran presence on the blueline with the Carolina Hurricanes. To begin the 2016–17 season, Nakládal was primarily a healthy scratch and appeared in just 3 games with the Hurricanes, before he was placed on waivers and assigned to the American Hockey League. After refusing to report to affiliate, the Charlotte Checkers, Nakládal's contract with Carolina was terminated on 14 November 2016. On 2 December 2016, Nakládal opted to return to the KHL for the remainder of the season, signing a one-year deal with Lokomotiv Yaroslavl.

After four seasons in the KHL with Lokomotiv, Nakládal opted to return to the Czech Republic, and rejoin his original club, HC Dynamo Pardubice, on a three-year contract on 17 June 2020. In January 2022 his contract with Dynamo was mutually terminated. Later that year he announced his retirement, attributing this decision to his lack of passion for hockey in spite of multiple offers from other Extraliga clubs.

International play 

Nakladal participated at the 2011 IIHF World Championship, 2012 IIHF World Championship (where he won a bronze medal), and 2013 IIHF World Championship as a member of the Czech Republic men's national ice hockey team. He participated in the 2015 IIHF World Championship in his home country and led all Czech defenseman with 5 assists in 10 games in a fourth-place finish.

Career statistics

Regular season and playoffs

International

References

External links

1987 births
Calgary Flames players
Carolina Hurricanes players
HC Chrudim players
Czech ice hockey defencemen
HC Lev Praha players
Living people
Lokomotiv Yaroslavl players
Ice hockey players at the 2018 Winter Olympics
Olympic ice hockey players of the Czech Republic
Sportspeople from Pardubice
HC Dynamo Pardubice players
Salavat Yulaev Ufa players
HC Spartak Moscow players
Stockton Heat players
HC TPS players
Undrafted National Hockey League players
Czech expatriate ice hockey players in the United States
Czech expatriate ice hockey players in Finland
Czech expatriate ice hockey players in Russia
Czech expatriate ice hockey players in Canada